Phelotrupes is a genus of beetles in the family Geotrupidae.

classification
This genus includes:

References

Taxa described in 1866
Geotrupidae
Beetle genera